Testis anion transporter 1 is a protein that in humans is encoded by the SLC26A8 gene.

Function 

This gene is one member of a family of sulfate/anion transporter genes. Family members are well conserved in their genomic (number and size of exons) and protein (aa length among species) structures yet have markedly different tissue expression patterns. This gene is expressed primarily in spermatocytes. Two transcript variants encoding different isoforms have been found.

Interactions 

SLC26A8 has been shown to interact with RACGAP1.

References

Further reading 

 
 
 
 

Solute carrier family